Ely Stefansky Ratner (born 1977) is an American foreign policy and defense advisor who is currently serving as Assistant Secretary of Defense for Indo-Pacific Security Affairs in the Biden administration.

Education 
Ratner earned a Bachelor of Arts degree from the School of Public and International Affairs at Princeton University and a PhD in political science from the University of California, Berkeley.

Career 
In 2002 and 2003, Ratner was a staffer to the United States Senate Committee on Foreign Relations, under then-Chairman Joe Biden. He was an associate political scientist at the RAND Corporation from 2009 to 2011. Ratner then joined the United States Department of State as China desk officer. From 2015 to 2017, Ratner served as deputy national security advisor to Biden during his Vice Presidency. After the end of the Obama administration, Ratner became a China studies fellow at the Council on Foreign Relations and executive vice president and director of studies at the Center for a New American Security.

DoD Nomination
On April 21, 2021, Ratner was nominated by President Joe Biden to be an Assistant Secretary of Defense for Indo-Pacific Security Affairs under Secretary Lloyd Austin. The Senate Armed Services Committee held hearings on Ratner's nomination on June 16, 2021. The committee favorably reported Ratner's nomination to the Senate floor on June 22, 2021. One month later, on July 22, 2021, the entire Senate confirmed Ratner by voice vote.

He was sworn in to the new position by Secretary Austin on July 25, 2021.

Personal life 
Ratner and his wife, Jennifer Yang, married in 2009.

References 

Living people
Place of birth missing (living people)
Princeton School of Public and International Affairs alumni
University of California, Berkeley alumni
Obama administration personnel
Biden administration personnel
United States Department of State officials
United States Assistant Secretaries of Defense
1977 births